Robin Söderling was the defending champion, but he decided not to compete this year.

Ivan Ljubičić defeated Michaël Llodra 7–5, 6–3 in the final.

Seeds

Draw

Finals

Top half

Bottom half

Qualifying

Seeds

Qualifiers

Draw

First qualifier

Second qualifier

Third qualifier

Fourth qualifier

External links
 Main Draw
 Qualifying Draw

Grand Prix de Tennis de Lyon - Singles
Singles